Carmen Villalobos (born Yorley del Carmen Villalobos Barrios on July 13, 1983) is a Colombian actress and model.

Career
She is best known for her character Catalina Santana in the telenovela Sin senos no hay paraíso based on the book by Gustavo Bolívar titled Sin tetas no hay paraíso. She won another major role in the Telemundo series, El Señor de los Cielos, where she played Leonor Ballesteros. She was also known as Alejandra Paz in the Telemundo novela, Niños Ricos, Pobres Padres. She recently re-personified Catalina Santana in the telenovela Sin senos sí hay paraíso, based on Bolivar's new book titled Sin tetas si hay paraíso, in the first season of the series only had a special participation as flashback and cameos. In the second season she was promoted as titular character of the series.

Personal life
She married her longtime boyfriend Sebastián Caicedo on October 18, 2019, in Cartagena, Colombia. On July 25, 2022 Villalobos confirmed she and Caicedo have been separated for several months.

Filmography

Awards and nominations

References

External links

1983 births
Living people
Colombian telenovela actresses
Colombian television actresses
People from Barranquilla